Renate Muhri is a German television actress.

She has made nearly 30 appearances mostly in television since 1977. In 1993 she appeared in the Austrian set comedy series Hochwürden erbt das Paradies. Her last performance was in Sommernachtstod in 2003.

External links

German television actresses
1945 births
Living people
20th-century German actresses
21st-century German actresses